Austroliotia australis, common name the southern liotia, is a species of sea snail, a marine gastropod mollusk in the family Liotiidae.

Description
The height of the shell attains 14 mm. The white shell is rather widely umbilicated. The rounded whorls contain spiral riblets and longitudinal striae. A beaded riblet winds into the umbilicus. The peristome is varicose. The inner margin is produced below and above.

Distribution
This marine species occurs in the subtidal zone off Australia (New South Wales, Victoria, South Australia, Western Australia) and Tasmania.

References

 Cotton, B. C. (1959). South Australian Mollusca. Archaeogastropoda. Adelaide. : W.L. Hawes. 449 pp., 1 pl.
 Jenkins, B.W. (1984). Southern Australian Liotiidae. Australian Shell News. 47 : 3–5
 Wilson, B. (1993). Australian Marine Shells. Prosobranch Gastropods. Kallaroo, WA : Odyssey Publishing. Vol.1 1st Edn pp. 1–408
 Grove, S. 2011. The Seashells of Tasmania: A Comprehensive Guide. Taroona, Australia: Taroona Publications. [vi], 81 page(s): 36

External links
 Kiener, L.-C., 1838 Famille des Plicacée de Lamarck et des Trochoides de Cuvier. Genre Dauphinule (Delphinula, Lamarck), in Species general et Iconographie des coquilles vivantes, p. 1-12
 

australis
Gastropods described in 1839